Alexanderson is a surname. Notable people with the surname include:

Ernst Alexanderson (1878–1975), Swedish-American electrical engineer, pioneer in radio and television development
Eva Alexanderson (1911–1994), Swedish writer and translator
Gerald L. Alexanderson (born 1933), American mathematician
Leroy J. Alexanderson (1910–2004), the last captain of the SS United States

Fictional characters
Lars Alexanderson, a character from the Tekken video game series

See also
Alex Anderson (disambiguation)
Alexanderson alternator, generates high frequency alternating current up to 100 kHz
Alexanderson Day, named after the Swedish radio engineer Ernst Fredrik Werner Alexanderson
Alexandersson
Alexander
Alexanders